Dream On, Dreamer was an Australian four piece alternative metalcore band from Melbourne, Victoria, Australia, formed in 2009.

The band released two EPs and three albums. The first EP Set Sail, Armada was released on 3 July 2009. Almost a year later, Dream On, Dreamer published the second EP called Hope on Boomtown Records and Triple Vision Records. After signing contracts with Rise Records and UNFD the band released the debut album Heartbound in August 2011. It was charted in the Australian Albums Charts and was nominated for ARIA Award for Best Hard Rock or Heavy Metal Album. Their second album Loveless followed in 2013. The third record, Songs of Soulitude was released on 13 November 2015 as an independent release and peaked on no. 26 in the official Australian Albums Charts.

The band toured North America, Europe, Japan, and Australia several times and played at the Soundwave Festival in 2012 and 2014. The band shared stage with bands like The Color Morale, Pierce the Veil, Memphis May Fire, Deez Nuts, Avenged Sevenfold, Confide, A Day to Remember and Silverstein.

On 9 February 2020, the band announced on social media that they would be parting ways after 11 years together. They cited the need to focus on their personal lives at this time.

History

2009–2010: Formation and beginning 
Dream On, Dreamer was formed in Melbourne, Victoria in 2009 with vocalist Marcel Gadacz, lead guitarist Callan Orr, drummer Aaron Fiocca, bassist and clean vocalist Michael McLeod and keyboarder Daniel Jungwirth in the original line-up. After some time, Marcel Gadacz, Michael McLeod, Callan Orr, and Daniel Jungwirth started working on their debut EP which is called Set Sail, Armada. The EP was released on 3 July 2009.

Their second EP, Hope, was released almost a year later, via Boomtown Records. The band supported Pierce the Veil between 9–19 September 2010, in Australia and New Zealand. Before forming Dream On, Dreamer, the musicians were members of several bands such as Francis Dolarhyde, State of East London, Electrik Dynamite, Goodbye Armadale, Arpejio and The Dream the Chase.

2011–2012: Heartbound 
After signing a record deal with Rise Records and UNFD the band released their debut album Heartbound on 21 August 2011 which was produced by Cameron Mizell who worked for acts like This Romantic Tragedy, Sleeping with Sirens and A Skylit Drive. It peaked on #38 at the Australian Albums Charts and was nominated for ARIA Award for Best Hard Rock or Heavy Metal Album.

In July 2011, the band was invited to be part of the Welcome to the Family Tour by Avenged Sevenfold which performed throughout Australia. Dream On, Dreamer replaced Sevendust which cancelled several weeks before the tour start. In October 2011, the band toured together with We Came as Romans and The Devil Wears Prada on the Dead Throne Australia Tour. In New Zealand, the bands toured together with Saving Grace. Before that tour the band shared stage with Memphis May Fire and The Color Morale which led throughout Belgium, Germany, France, the United Kingdom, Austria, Italy and the Netherlands.

In January and February 2012, Dream On, Dreamer toured throughout the United States as support for Attack Attack!, Sleeping with Sirens, The Ghost Inside and Chunk! No, Captain Chunk!. They had to jump off this tour a week early, to see them head to Japan for the first time with We Came As Romans and Crossfaith, as well as a bunch of locals on the Scream Out Festival in Osaka in late February Early March, the band, toured Soundwave Festival for the first time. The band played two side-shows with Underoath during the festival. In August and September 2012, the band toured their Homebound Tour with In Hearts Wake, Like Moths To Flames and Hand of Mercy as support acts. The debut album was re-released as a Tour Edition including some bonus songs and a documentary DVD. In November, Michael McLeod announced he would be finishing up at the end of the year due to him being announced a father to be. In November and December 2012, Dream On, Dreamer were part of the Mayhem Tour. This was Michael McLeod's last tour as the bassist and clean vocalist. The band shared the stage with In Fear and Faith, Make Them Suffer and Saviour. Daniel Jungwirth replaced him as bassist and so the six-piece band became a quintet.

2013: Loveless 
At the beginning of 2013 Zachary Britt of The Dream, The Chase joined the band on rhythm guitar and clean vocals. The band got dropped by Rise Records. In March and April 2013, Dream On, Dreamer played their second European Tour as support for Abandon All Ships, No Bragging Rights and For the Fallen Dreams. Their second album entitled Loveless was released worldwide on 28 June 2013 via UNFD. The album got peaked at #29 at the ARIA Albums Charts for one week. Between 12 and 18 July 2013, the band supported A Day to Remember and The Devil Wears Prada in Australia. In September, the band played in Japan for the second time. The band had to play some of their gigs without their original drummer Aaron Fiocca, due to him being diagnosed with cancer.

At the end of October 2013, the band toured Australia on their Loveless Tour with support of A Skylit Drive, No Bragging Rights and Hellions. The band was support alongside Palisades for Silverstein during their Europe tour in the End of 2013.

2014–2017: Songs of Soulitude 
In the middle of January 2014, the band stated they were working on new songs for their third record "Songs of Soulitude" which was released in 2015. In February and March 2014, the band were part of the Soundwave Festival. In April 2014, the band announced their split-up with Daniel Jungwirth and shortly after, they found their replacement; former guitarist of House vs. Hurricane, Chris Shaw.

Between 4–15 June 2014, the band toured Australia alongside Being as an Ocean as support band for In Hearts Wake during their Earthwalker Tour.

On 8 August 2014, the band released a new song called "Darkness Brought Me Here". On 15 June 2015, the song "Don't Lose Your Heart" was released.
 
Dream On Dreamer has announced upcoming Australian shows alongside various artists from 31 May to 30 June 2018 on their headlining "It Comes And Goes" tour.

2018–2019: It Comes And Goes  
On 25 May 2018, the band released their new album It Comes And Goes.

2020–2022: What if i told you it doesn't get better  
On 10 April 2020, the band released its final album, What if i told you it doesn't get better. The band announced on twitter it will be doing a farewell album to celebrate their 11 years. March 22, 2020 they announced on twitter they would be postponing their farewell tour due to the Covid-19 pandemic. The shows were eventually rescheduled in 2022. They also released a new song on May 31 titled "Hurricane" as a swan song to the band.

Musical style 
Dream On, Dreamer are considered an "Australian alternative/hardcore sextet". The British magazine Rock Sound describes their debut album as "rooted in metalcore but packed with a heaving mass of ideas born out of the intricate arrangements, use of melody and electronics."

On their second album, Loveless, the sound of Dream On, Dreamer is described as being more melodic than their previous records. One of the reasons explaining this change was that Daniel Jungwirth had changed instruments from keyboard to bass guitar, and electronic passages on the album were arranged with backtracking. In comparison with their debut record, Dream On, Dreamer used less electronic samples on Loveless. The music on Loveless was primarily written by Callan Orr. The band has extensively worked together to create their new album.

The songs' lyrics are all written by vocalist Marcel Gadacz.

Band members 

Final Line-up
 Marcel Gadacz – unclean vocals (2008–2022), clean vocals (2014–2022), drums (2018–2022)
 Callan Orr  – lead guitar (2008–2022), backing vocals (2013-2022)
 Zachary Britt – rhythm guitar, clean vocals, piano, keyboards (2013–2022)
 Chris Shaw – bass (2014–2022)

Former members
 Michael "McCoy" McLeod – bass, clean vocals (2008–2012)
 Luke Domic – rhythm guitar (2008–2013)
 Daniel "Deej" Jungwirth – keyboards, synthesizers, piano, samples (2008–2013); bass (2012–2014)
 Aaron Fiocca – drums (2008–2015)
 Dylan Kuiper – drums (2015–2018)

Timeline

Discography

Albums

EPs

Awards and nominations

ARIA Music Awards
The ARIA Music Awards are a set of annual ceremonies presented by Australian Recording Industry Association (ARIA), which recognise excellence, innovation, and achievement across all genres of the music of Australia. They commenced in 1987. 

! 
|-
| 2011 || Heartbound || ARIA Award for Best Hard Rock or Heavy Metal Album ||  ||

Music Victoria Awards
The Music Victoria Awards are an annual awards night celebrating Victorian music. They commenced in 2006.

! 
|-
| Music Victoria Awards of 2018
| It Comes and Goes
| Best Heavy Album
| 
| 
|-

References

External links 
 

Australian alternative metal musical groups
Australian metalcore musical groups
Musical groups established in 2009
Musical groups disestablished in 2020
Rise Records artists